Ross O'Carroll (born 1 January 1987) is a hurling and football player for Kilmacud Crokes and formerly of Dublin.

Hurling
O'Carroll made his championship debut for Dublin against Wexford in the 2007 Leinster championship and scored a total of 1–01 in a game which Dublin lost by a point. O'Carroll helped guide Dublin to victory in the 2005 Leinster Minor Hurling Championship by scoring one point in the game.

Football
He won a Dublin Senior Football Championship medal with Crokes in October 2008 at Parnell Park appearing as a substitute. He then went on to win the Leinster Senior Club Football Championship and the All-Ireland Senior Club Football Championship with Crokes.

References

1987 births
Living people
Dual players
Dublin inter-county hurlers
Kilmacud Crokes Gaelic footballers
Kilmacud Crokes hurlers
People educated at Oatlands College